Aayemenaytcheia paragranulata is a Middle Devonian proetid trilobite.

Etymology 
The genus name is the vocalisation of the acronym AMNH of the American Museum of Natural History and the suffix -ia (Aay-Em-En-Aytche-ia), as gratitude for funding Lieberman's research.
The species epithet paragranulata refers to the fact that the species was first regarded as closely related to Dechenella granulata.

Distribution 
A. paragranulata has been collected from the Devonian of Canada (Emsian and Eifelian, Blue Fjord Formation, Bathurst Island, Nunavut).

Taxonomy 
Aayemenaytcheia paragranulata was originally described as a species belonging to the genus Dechenella. Recent cladistic analysis however makes it likely the species is in fact the earliest branch of a clade that further includes Lacunoporaspis, Dechenella, Schizoproetus and Schizoproetoides. So in order to retain the monophyly of the genus Dechenella, a new genus was erected for D. paragranulata.

References

External links 
 Aayemenaytcheia | Trilobites Online

Early Devonian animals
Proetidae
Proetida genera
Fossils of Canada
Paleontology in Nunavut
Middle Devonian animals